The World Treasury of Science Fiction is a science fiction anthology edited by David G. Hartwell, published by Little, Brown and Company in 1989.

Contents

 Foreword by Clifton Fadiman
 Introduction by David G. Hartwell
 "Harrison Bergeron" by Kurt Vonnegut Jr.
 "Forgetfulness" by John W. Campbell Jr.
 "Special Flight" by John Berryman
 "Chronopolis" by J. G. Ballard
 "Triceratops" by Kono Tensei
 "The Man Who Lost the Sea" by Theodore Sturgeon
 "On the Inside Track" by Karl Michael Armer
 "The Golem" by Avram Davidson
 "The New Prehistory" by Rene Rebetez-Cortes
 "A Meeting with Medusa" by Arthur C. Clarke
 "The Valley of Echoes" by Gerard Klein
 "The Fifth Head of Cerberus" by Gene Wolfe
 "The Chaste Planet" by John Updike
 "The Blind Pilot" by Nathalie-Charles Henneberg
 "The Men Who Murdered Mohammed" by Alfred Bester
 "Pairpuppets" by Manuel van Loggem
 "Two Dooms" by C.M. Kornbluth
 "Tale of the Computer That Fought a Dragon" by Stanislaw Lem
 "The Green Hills of Earth" by Robert A. Heinlein
 "Ghost V" by Robert Sheckley
 "The Phantom of Kansas" by John Varley
 "Captain Nemo's Last Adventure" by Josef Nesvadba
 "Inconstant Moon" by Larry Niven
 "The Gold at the Starbow's End" by Frederik Pohl
 "A Sign in Space" by Italo Calvino
 "The Spiral" by Italo Calvino
 "The Dead Past" by Isaac Asimov
 "The Lens" by Annemarie van Ewyck
 "The Hurkle is a Happy Beast" by Theodore Sturgeon
 "Zero Hour" by Ray Bradbury
 "Nine Lives" by Ursula K. Le Guin
 "The Muse" by Anthony Burgess
 "The Public Hating" by Steve Allen
 "Poor Superman" by Fritz Leiber
 "Angouleme" by Thomas M. Disch
 "Stranger Station" by Damon Knight
 "The Dead Fish" by Boris Vian
 "I Was the First to Find You" by Kirill Bulychev
 "The Lineman" by Walter M. Miller Jr.
 "Tlön, Uqbar, Orbis Tertius" by Jorge Luis Borges
 "Codemus" by Tor Age Bringsvaerd
 "A Kind of Artistry" by Brian Aldiss
 "Second Variety" by Philip K. Dick
 "Weihnachtsabend" by Keith Roberts
 "I Do Not Love You, Doctor Fell" by Robert Bloch
 "Aye, and Gomorrah..." by Samuel R. Delany
 "How Erg the Self-inducting Slew a Paleface" by Stanislaw Lem
 "Nobody's Home" by Joanna Russ
 "Party Line" by Gerard Klein
 "The Proud Robot" by Lewis Padgett
 "Vintage Season" by Henry Kuttner and C.L. Moore
 "The Way to Amalteia" by Arkady and Boris Strugatsky

References
 The Locus Index to Science Fiction
 the Internet Book list

1989 anthologies
Science fiction anthologies
Little, Brown and Company books